Westpoint Blacktown is a large shopping centre situated in Blacktown, Western Sydney, New South Wales, owned by Queensland Investment Corporation. It was first opened in 1973, and then renovated and expanded in 2006, making it one of the biggest shopping centres in Western Sydney.  The centre serves as a major retail hub for the region.

History
Westpoint Blacktown first opened in 1973, surrounded by, starting clockwise from north, Kildare Road, Patrick Street, Alpha Street and Balmoral Street.

Expansion
The eastern expansion of the mall commenced in May 2003 and completed in April 2006. Patrick Street was closed, and Patrick Mall and Max Webber library on the eastern side of Patrick Street were closed and rebuilt as the expansion of the mall.

The refurbishment was to be undertaken by Baulderstone Hornibrook Pty Ltd (BHPL). However BHPL and QIC became embroiled in legal proceedings regarding the payment of outstanding progress payments which BHPL claimed were owing to it. This court proceeding delayed construction. In October 2006, QIC terminated the contract with BHPL.

Due to the closure of Myer which made up the most floor area at Westpoint, the east wing has went underneath a multi-million dollar redevelopment initiative to attract more costumers. Part of this redevelopment include: relocating JB-Hi-Fi and Cotton-On, reopening Harris Scarfe, relocation of the existing Vibe Health Club Gym to be reopened as a Club Lime Gym in May 2023, opening a variety of new specialty stores and remodeling the flooring and ceiling.

Myer closure 
In February 2022, Myer announced its plan to close its department store in Westpoint Blacktown on 3 April of the same year. The company stated the move as a desire to follow its 'Customer First Plan', to downsize and shift more sales online. Myer cited as an example, the decision to close Myer Knox, in Melbourne's east in July 2021. The Myer store was replaced by a relocated JB Hi-fi and Harris Scarfe on level 2, Cotton On on level 3 and a Club Lime Gym on Level 4 due to open by mid 2023. There are plans for UNIQLO to be opened in mid-2023.

Stores and features
The centre incorporates several key retail outlets: including department stores Big W, Kmart (which is located outside of the centre) and Target as well as supermarket chains Woolworths and Aldi (replaced Franklins). The refurbishment incorporated an entertainment precinct, which incorporates a Hoyts 10 screen cinema, Zone Bowling alley and a video arcade. Level 4 is primarily made of restaurants and dining options. Major brands which have store here include: JB-Hi-Fi, Foot-Locker, JD Sports, Cotton-On, Adidas Originals, Rebel, TK MaxX,  etc. In December 2019 Taco Bell opened in Westpoint Blacktown.

Car Park and transport
The centre incorporates a large multi-level car park. In 2018, half of the car park remained closed until further notice due to issues with structural integrity. Repair work commenced in early 2019 was completed in October 2019 in time for the 2019 Christmas period. There is a taxi rank on level four. The basement level of the mall is an underground bus station, opened in 2006 as part of the refurbishment and expansion of Westpoint, providing a direct connection by bus services to surrounding suburbs. The main entrance on Level 3 is within short walking distance to Blacktown railway station and nearby alternate taxi ranks.

References

External links
Centre Homepage

Shopping centres in Sydney
Shopping malls established in 1973